KLN College of Information Technology is the co-educational engineering college in Madurai, started in 2001 by the Sourashtra Community which is a linguistic minority in Tamil Nadu. The college is sponsored by a committee of industrialists and academicians, led by Thiru. K.L.N. Krishnan. The college is approved by the All India Council for Technical Education, New Delhi, and is affiliated to Anna University, Chennai.

Location and infrastructure
KLN College of Information Technology is situated on the eastern outskirts of Madurai,  on the Madurai - Nedungulam Road, Near Pottapalayam. The college is adjacent to the KLN College of Engineering. The campus has a multi-storied library with video facilities, air-conditioned computer laboratories, computer systems, multimedia, and scanners. There are laboratories, an engineering drawing hall, staff and students room, and a canteen.

Placement
The placement department provides job placement services, in-industry training of previous year students, and the final year projects for all the Engineering UG and PG courses under Government organizations and corporate bodies. Personality Development programs are available for the students.

Other Group Colleges
 KLN College of Engineering and Technology.
 KLN Polytechnic College.
 KLN B.Ed. College.

External links
 KLN College of Information Technology

Engineering colleges in Tamil Nadu
Colleges in Madurai
Science and technology in Madurai
Colleges affiliated to Anna University
Educational institutions established in 2001
2001 establishments in Tamil Nadu